The following lists events that happened during 1949 in Chile.

Incumbents
President of Chile: Gabriel González Videla

Events

January 
14 January - The law granting Chilean women the right to vote in parliamentary and presidential elections is published.

February
5 February - Chilean Army Captain Alberto Larraguibel breaks the high Jump world record with his horse Huaso, overcoming an obstacle of 2.47 meters.

March
6 March – Chilean parliamentary election, 1949

April
19 April - In the Araucania Region, an earthquake measuring 7.3 degrees on the Richter scale mainly affected the cities of Angol, Temuco and Los Angeles , leaving 35 dead, 155 injured and 2,065 homeless.

July 
 15 July – Chile dismisses two consuls in New York City because of alleged Communist ties.
 16 July – Chile disenfranchises female Communist voters.

August
6 August - Condorito is published for the first time in Okey magazine.
16 August And 17 August - Demonstrations are held in Santiago due to the rise in public transport fares, known as the "Chaucha Revolution".

December
17 December – 1949 Tierra del Fuego earthquake

Births
2 March – Antonio Vodanovic
25 March – Juan Carlos Latorre
13 August – Rogelio Farías (d. 1995)
20 November – Alejandro Pierola
1 December – Sebastián Piñera
4 December – Arturo Salah

Deaths
24 May – Rosita Renard (b. 1894)
date unknown – Adolfo Ibáñez Boggiano (b. 1880)

References 

 
Years of the 20th century in Chile
Chile